Edwina Louise Christie Bartholomew (born 5 July 1983) is an Australian journalist and television presenter.

Bartholomew is currently news presenter on the Seven Network's breakfast television program Sunrise. She has previously been a co-host of Dancing with the Stars and Australian Spartan.

Career
Bartholomew completed her journalism degree at Charles Sturt University and also completed a Masters of International Studies in 2006 at Sydney University. She won a Sunrise Intern competition, where she progressed from making coffee to producing the show.

She also worked as a reporter on 2GB and covered the Beijing Olympics for the Seven Network.

She later returned to Australia and continued to work as a reporter for Seven News before signing on as Sunrise's Sydney correspondent in 2011. She also filed stories for Sunday Night.

In July 2013, Bartholomew was appointed weather presenter on Sunrise.

In September 2013, Bartholomew was appointed co-host of Dancing with the Stars.

In January 2016, Bartholomew announced that she would be leaving her role as weather presenter on Sunrise after three years to become the show's entertainment presenter, and primary fill-in news presenter. She was replaced by Sam Mac.

In 2018 and 2019, Bartholomew co-hosted Australian Spartan alongside Hamish McLachlan.

In March 2021, Bartholomew was appointed news presenter on Sunrise replacing Natalie Barr who was promoted to co-host following Samantha Armytage's resignation.

Personal life
Bartholomew was born in Whyalla, South Australia. She spent her early years living in Japan and Malaysia. She later boarded at Abbotsleigh School in Wahroonga, Sydney, where she completed her Higher School Certificate and featured in the Distinguished Achievers List.

Bartholomew lives in Sydney and is married with two children.

In August 2021, Bartholomew announced that she was pregnant with her second child, which is due in February 2022.

References

1983 births
Australian television journalists
Charles Sturt University alumni
Weather presenters
People from Whyalla
Living people
People educated at Abbotsleigh